In control theory, dynamical systems are in strict-feedback form when they can be expressed as

where
  are scalars,
  is a scalar input to the system,
  vanish at the origin (i.e.),
  are nonzero over the domain of interest (i.e.,  for ).
That is, the system has a kind of lower triangular form.

Stabilization

Systems in strict-feedback form can be stabilized by recursive application of backstepping. That is,

 It is given that the system

is already stabilized to the origin by some control  where . It is also assumed that a Lyapunov function  for this stable subsystem is known.
 A control  is designed so that the system

is stabilized so that  follows the desired  control. The control design is based on the augmented Lyapunov function candidate

 A control  is designed so that the system

is stabilized so that  follows the desired  control. The control design is based on the augmented Lyapunov function candidate

 This process continues until the actual  is known, and
 The real control  stabilizes  to fictitious control .
 The fictitious control  stabilizes  to fictitious control .
 The fictitious control  stabilizes  to fictitious control .
 ...
 The fictitious control  stabilizes  to fictitious control .
 The fictitious control  stabilizes  to fictitious control .
 The fictitious control  stabilizes  to the origin.

This process is known as backstepping because it starts with the requirements on some internal subsystem for stability and progressively steps back out of the system, maintaining stability at each step. Because
 the given control  has ,

See also
 Nonlinear control
 Backstepping

References

Nonlinear control